"Don't Upset the Rhythm (Go Baby Go)" is the second single from British band Noisettes' second studio album, Wild Young Hearts (2009). Released on 23 March 2009, the song debuted and peaked at number two on the UK Singles Chart. The official remix features Wale and Estelle. The track was prominently featured in television advertisements for Mazda 2 throughout 2009 and 2010 in the United Kingdom.

Critical reception
Of the track, USA Today said "The London band has a grabber in Shingai Shoniwa's soul-jazz vocal, funky bass lines, snappy guitars and disco beat."

Chart performance
In the United Kingdom, the song made its debut on 29 March 2009 at number two and made it to number one on the iTunes downloads chart, becoming the band's highest-charting single to date. The song entered the Irish Singles Chart at number 55 on 2 April 2009. On 9 April, "Don't Upset the Rhythm (Go Baby Go)" was the Irish chart's "greatest gainer" of the week after jumping to number 18 and ultimately peaking at number 8.

Track listing
Digital single
"Don't Upset the Rhythm (Go Baby Go)" - 3:48
"Don't Upset the Rhythm (Go Baby Go)" [Kissy Sell Out in The Black Lodge Remix] - 5:02

Charts

Weekly charts

Year-end charts

Certifications

References

External links
 

2009 singles
Mercury Records singles
Noisettes songs
Song recordings produced by Jim Abbiss
Songs written by George Astasio
Songs written by Jason Pebworth